Vlasta Chramostová (17 November 1926 – 6 October 2019) was a Czech film actress. She appeared in 35 films since 1950. She starred in the 1950 film The Trap which was entered into the 1951 Cannes Film Festival.

A signatory of Charter 77, she was active in the Velvet Revolution, where the Czechoslovak Socialist Republic was overthrown in November 1989. At a rally at the Vinohrady Theatre in Prague, she was quoted as asking the crowd: "If not now, when? If not us, then who?"

Selected filmography
 The Trap (1950)
 The Secret of Blood (1953)
 The Cassandra Cat (1963)
 The Cremator (1969)
 Sekal Has to Die (1998)
 Leaving (2011)

References

External links
 

1926 births
2019 deaths
Czech film actresses
Czech stage actresses
Charter 77 signatories
Actors from Brno
Recipients of the Order of Tomáš Garrigue Masaryk
Recipients of the Thalia Award